Ludhiana Metro was a proposed rapid transit system for the city of Ludhiana, Punjab. It is expected to cost .

History
The Delhi Metro Rail Corporation was asked to prepare a detailed project report (DPR) in 2007. The state government estimated the project cost to be  at 2007 prices. The DPR was scheduled to be finalized by the end of September 2012.

The DMRC report proposed 2 corridors. The first corridor of Ludhiana Metro will be 15.798 km long having 14 stations. The second corridor will be 13.035 km long with 13 stations. A detailed feasibility study has been done by Delhi Metro Rail Corporation Ltd which took one and half years. The DMRC will be the Punjab Government's official consultant on the project. A special purpose vehicle, the Punjab Metro Rail Corporation (PMRC), will be established to execute the project.

On 17 July 2012, Punjab Chief Minister Parkash Singh Badal approved the project in the Public-Private Partnership (PPP) or Build Operate Transfer (BOT) model. On 2 September 2012, Deputy Chief Minister Sukhbir Singh Badal appointed the Ludhiana Municipal Commissioner as managing director of Ludhiana Metro and the Commissioner will be responsible for time bound completion.

Routes
The metro in Ludhiana will be of total 29 kilometers, of which 22 km will be elevated and 7 km will be underground. The two proposed corridors are:

Corridor I: Ayali Chowk – BBMB Power House
This line will run from East to West following a distance of 15.798 km and will have 14 stations – 10 elevated and 4 underground. The stations are :

 Ayali Chowk
 Rajguru Nagar
 Aggar Nagar
 Verka Milk Plant
 PAU
 Aarti Chowk
 Bharat Nagar Chowk
 Guru Nanak Stadium
 Gurdwara Dukh Niwaran
 Civil Hospital
 Samrala Chowk
 Vardhman Mills
 Jamalpur
 BBMB Power House

Corridor II: Gill Village – Rahon Road Chungi
This line will run from North to South covering a distance of 13.035 km and will have 13 stations – 6 elevated and 7 underground. The stations are :
 Gill village
 GNE College
 ATI Chowk
 Janta Nagar Chowk
 Gill Chowk
 City Bus Station
 Railway Station
 Basti Jodhewal
 Rahon Road Chungi
 Tibba road(near Satsang Ghar)
 Salem Taberi
 Kakobal Road
 Tajpur Road
 Clock tower

Project Details

Estimated per kilometer cost for the construction of the metro will be Rs 1.75 billion for elevated track and Rs 3.25 billion for the underground. The average cost per kilometer is around Rs 3 billion.

There will be two maintenance depots for the metro, one will be near Baddowal and will spread over 26 hectares, and the second depot will be near Gill village spread over 21 hectares. At these depots, washing, cleaning, repair and maintenance of the train engine and bogies will be carried out.

The ticketing system of the Ludhiana Metro will be similar as of Delhi Metro, tentatively Rs 10 for first two kilometers and then there is formula to calculate further fares.

The DPR further states that the state government should exempt Punjab Value Added Tax (VAT) on the metro, and also charge no tax be on the electricity required for the operations. It has also proposed exemption of municipal taxes.

Also a Special Purpose Vehicle (SPV) should be set up for the Ludhiana Metro and should be registered under Companies Act. It should be a public sector undertaking of the state government and be named "Punjab Metro Rail Corporation".

Earlier, the total cost of the project was estimated at Rs 105.16 billion and was to be operational by 2014. Of the 29 km, some 12 km were underground, while rest would be above the ground.

See also
Ludhiana BRTS

References

External links
Ludhiana Metro project in limbo
Ludhiana Metro awaits Center’s viability gap funding nod, says Sukhbir Badal

Proposed rapid transit in India
Transport in Ludhiana